One Israel (Yisrael Ahat) was an alliance of the Labor Party, Meimad and Gesher created to run for the 1999 Knesset elections.

Background
One Israel was formed by Labor leader Ehud Barak in the run-up to the 1999 elections with the aim of making Labor appear more centrist and to reduce its secularist and elitist reputation amongst Mizrahi voters (Gesher was led by prominent Mizrahi politician and former Likud MK David Levy whilst Meimad is a religious party) modelled on Tony Blair's transformation of the British Labour Party into New Labour. The coalition agreement gave Gesher the number three spot on the list (behind Barak and Shimon Peres), two other safe positions and a promise that Levy would get a ministerial position. Meimad were promised one safe spot on the list and a ministerial position for a member who did not make it into the Knesset.

In the run-up to the election, surveys predicted the party would win 33 seats. However, although One Israel did emerge as the largest faction in the Knesset, its 26 seats was the lowest ever by a winning party (Labor's 34 in the 1996 elections whilst running alone had been the previous low). Of the 26 seats, Labor took 22, Gesher three and Meimad one. As per the pre-election agreement, Levy was appointed Deputy Prime Minister and Minister of Foreign Affairs and Meimad's Michael Melchior was made Minister of Social and Diaspora Affairs.

Barak, who had beaten Binyamin Netanyahu in the election for Prime Minister, had to form an unstable coalition government with six other parties: Shas, Meretz, Yisrael BaAliyah, the Centre Party, the National Religious Party and United Torah Judaism.

Barak's participation in the Camp David Summit with Yasser Arafat in summer 2000 led to Gesher pulling out of the alliance on 7 March 2001. On 7 May the alliance was joined by the single member New Way faction, but on 15 May 2001 it ceased to exist, as the parliamentary group was renamed Labor-Meimad.

After the party's collapse, Barak was investigated following allegations that the One Israel had broken the party funding law by allowing money from abroad to be directed into campaign funds through non-profit groups in order to get around spending limits. State Comptroller Eliezer Goldberg had already fined the party 13 million shekels for breaking fund-raising laws. It later became known as the "Barak Organisation Affair".

Composition

Election results

References

External links
One Israel Knesset website

Defunct political party alliances in Israel
Political parties established in 1999
Political parties disestablished in 2001
1999 establishments in Israel
2001 disestablishments in Israel
Israeli Labor Party
Zionist political parties in Israel